"Your Game" is a song by British singer Will Young. It was written by  Young, Taio Cruz and Blair MacKichan for his second studio album, Friday's Child (2003), while production was helmed by Stephen Lipson and MacKichan. The song was released as the album's second single on 15 March 2004, reaching number three on the UK Singles Chart. "Your Game" song won the Brit Award for Song of the Year in 2005.

Music video
A music video for "Your Game" was directed by Michael Gracey and Pete Commins. After their collaboration, they were invited to direct Will's live tour at Wembley in 2004.

Track listings

Credits and personnel
Neil Conti – drums 
Taio Cruz – writer
Stephen Lipson – producer, programming
Bair MacKichan – drums, guitar, programming, writer
Heff Moraes – mixing engineer
Dave Naughton – protools
Will Young – vocals, writer

Charts

Weekly charts

Year-end charts

Release history

References

External links
 

Will Young songs
19 Recordings singles
2003 songs
2004 singles
Bertelsmann Music Group singles
Brit Award for British Single
Song recordings produced by Stephen Lipson
Songs written by Blair MacKichan
Songs written by Taio Cruz
Songs written by Will Young
Syco Music singles